Dubnow Garden (alternative spelling Dubnov) is a public park and garden located in the center of Tel Aviv, Israel, lying at the back of the Tel Aviv Performing Arts Center. The park is named for Simon Dubnow, a Jewish Belarusian historian, writer and activist. The street sharing its name (Dubnow Street) makes up the western border of the garden.

Dubnow Garden is very popular with young families, students and dog owners. It contains playgrounds and outdoor exercise equipment.

External links

Parks in Tel Aviv
Urban public parks